German submarine U-849 was a long-range Type IXD2 U-boat built for Nazi Germany's Kriegsmarine during World War II. Laid down in Bremen and launched on 31 October 1942.

Design
German Type IXD2 submarines were considerably larger than the original Type IXs. U-849 had a displacement of  when at the surface and  while submerged. She had two shafts and two  propellers.

U-849 was fitted with six  torpedo tubes (four fitted at the bow and two at the stern), 24 torpedoes, one  SK C/32 naval gun, 150 rounds, and a  SK C/30 with 2575 rounds as well as two  C/30 anti-aircraft guns with 8100 rounds. The boat had a complement of fifty-five.

Service history
Even though she was commanded by top U-boat ace Kapitänleutnant Heinz-Otto Schultze (Knight's Cross), she neither sank nor damaged any vessels.

She joined 4th Flotilla for training on 11 March 1943, where she remained until 30 September 1943, whence she then joined 12th Flotilla for active service until her sinking on 25 November 1943.

Fate
U-849 was sunk by depth charges dropped by a US Navy P4BY-1 Liberator bomber from VB-107 in the South Atlantic west of the River Congo estuary at position  on 25 November 1943. All 63 hands were lost.

References

Bibliography

External links

Ships lost with all hands
World War II submarines of Germany
German Type IX submarines
World War II shipwrecks in the Atlantic Ocean
World War II shipwrecks in the South Atlantic
U-boats sunk by depth charges
U-boats sunk by US aircraft
U-boats commissioned in 1943
U-boats sunk in 1943
1942 ships
Ships built in Bremen (state)
Maritime incidents in November 1943